Minkhaung Medaw was a principal queen of King Taka Yut Pi of Hanthawaddy (Ramanya) from  1535 to 1539, and of King Min Bin of Mrauk U (Arakan) from  1540 to 1554. A daughter of King Bayin Htwe of Prome, the queen is also referred to as Pegu Mibaya and Tanzaung Mibaya in the royal chronicles.

Brief

Early life
The future queen was born to Prince Htwe of Prome (Pyay) and his second wife Chit Mi  late 1510s. She was descended from a long line of rulers of Prome from both sides, and ultimately from King Narapati I of Ava (r. 1442–1468) from both sides. She was a granddaughter of then King of Prome, Thado Minsaw. The princess had three full siblings—an elder brother Minye Sithu (later known as King Minkhaung of Prome), a younger sister later known as Vicereine Laygyun Mibaya of Toungoo, and a younger brother who died young; and four half-siblings, including King Narapati of Prome and Vicereine Narapati Medaw of Prome. Her personal name is unknown; Minkhaung Medaw was a title (literally, "Minkhaung's Royal Younger Sister").

The princess likely grew up in Prome since her father succeeded in becoming king in 1526. In the 1530s and 1540s, the princess became involved in two marriages of state, courtesy of her two brothers.

Queen of Hanthawaddy Pegu (Ramanya)
Circa 1535, her half brother Narapati, who had succeeded their father as king since 1532, married her off to King Taka Yut Pi of Hanthawaddy Pegu. Narapati also married Taka Yut Pi's sister. The marriages were intended to cement the burgeoning alliance between Prome and Pegu. The two kingdoms had been in a low grade conflict with the upstart kingdom of Toungoo over Tharrawaddy, the southernmost district of Prome, since 1531. Her marriage to Taka Yut Pi came as the conflict had escalated to a full blown war between Toungoo and Pegu. The marriage was one of the three state marriage alliances executed by Narapati. The king of Prome, who was a vassal of Ava, also sent his full sister Narapati Medaw to marry Gov. Sithu Kyawhtin of Salin (a powerful governor and ally of Ava) to further cement the relationship with Ava, and his other half sister, Laygyun Mibaya, to marry King Tabinshwehti of Toungoo with the hope of avoiding an all out war with Toungoo.

If Narapati's marriage alliances kept Prome out of Toungoo's immediate wrath, Minkhaung Medaw's new home, Pegu (Bago), came under repeated Toungoo attacks for the next three years. In late 1538, Taka Yut Pi decided to evacuate Pegu, and the royal family of Pegu retreated to Prome. Because of her stint at Pegu, she is referred to as Pegu Mibaya (ပဲခူး မိဖုရား, ; "Queen of Pegu"). However, soon after their arrival at Prome, her husband and her brother Narapati, king of Prome, both died, one after another.

Queen of Mrauk U (Arakan)
She would not remain a widow for long. Prome was now at war with Toungoo, and the new king of Prome Minkhaung, her elder brother, sent her off to marry King Min Bin of Mrauk U in another marriage alliance  1540. At Mrauk U, she became known as Tanzaung Mibaya (တန်ဆောင်း မိဖုရား, ; "Queen of the Royal Hall").

Ancestry
The following is the queen's ancestry.

Notes

References

Bibliography
 
 
 
 

Queens consort of Hanthawaddy
Queens consort of Mrauk-U